Brebeuf College School (Brebeuf College, BCS, or Brebeuf) is a publicly funded Roman Catholic all-boys high school in Toronto, Ontario, Canada endorsed by the Jesuits of Canada. Founded by the Jesuits in 1963, it is part of the Toronto Catholic District School Board and associated with the Presentation Brothers since 1984. Brebeuf is the brother school of nearby St. Joseph's Morrow Park Catholic Secondary School.

Students participate in a various activities, including faith and service-related clubs, music and drama productions, and athletic programs at both the intramural and extramural levels. Extended French, Gifted, ESL, and Co-operative Education programs are available for students with appropriate qualifications. Brebeuf offers an Enriched program that allows students to study advanced material and to develop university-level skills, preparing them to take the AP exam and earn an Advanced Placement university credit while still in high school. The school began offering an application-based STEAM (Science, Technology, Engineering, Arts, and Mathematics) program in 2020.

The school operates on the semester system and has an enrolment of 958 students in the 2017-18 school year. The majority of students come from Willowdale and northern Scarborough; roughly 20% live in York Region and students travel from as far away as Newmarket, Mississauga, and Pickering to attend the college. Almost 20% of the teaching staff are alumni. The motto of the school is "Studio Gradum Faciant" (To win merit through study).

History

St. Jean de Brébeuf

The school was named after Saint Jean de Brébeuf, a French Jesuit priest (the priests who founded the school in 1963 were Jesuits of the Upper Canada Province) who first came to Canada in 1625, 17 years after the founding of the country by Champlain's French colonists in 1608. Brebeuf journeyed to the area around what is now Midland, Ontario and preached to the Huron people of that area. In 1649  an Iroquois raid on a Huron village captured de Brébeuf, aged 56, and others; they were ritually tortured and killed. De Brébeuf was canonised as a saint in 1930. In 1954 his grave was discovered by Father Denis Hegarty, S.J. at the present site of Ste.-Marie-among the Hurons, near Midland, with a plaque reading "P. Jean de Brébeuf /brusle par les Iroquois /le 17 de mars l'an/1649" (Father Jean de Brébeuf, burned by the Iroquois, 17 March 1649). de Brebeuf is the patron of Brebeuf College School.

Beginnings
The school opened with one hundred students in Grades 9 and 10 in September 1963. Brebeuf's first graduation class in 1966 consisted of 30 students, among them Michael Daoust, who became head of mathematics at Brebeuf.

In 1967, the school entered an agreement with the Metropolitan Separate School Board (now the Toronto Catholic District School Board), whereby Grade 9 and 10 students would be under the publicly funded separate school system and Grades 11, 12, and 13 would continue as a private school. This arrangement happened at most Catholic high schools in Ontario at the request of the bishops of the province. 74 students graduated, two of whom were Michael Daoust and Dr. Robert Lato, formerly the head of guidance at Brebeuf.

Presentation Brothers
In May 1983, Father Winston Rye, the Provincial of the Jesuits, announced that the Jesuits were going to give up responsibilities for the operation of Brebeuf College School by June 1984. This decision was made necessary by the steady decline of available manpower. Immediately, Cardinal Gerald Emmett Carter and the staff of the Archdiocese of Toronto began to explore the possibilities to ensure the continual operation of Brebeuf. In February 1984, Cardinal Carter's office announced that the Presentation Brothers were willing to assume responsibility for Brebeuf College, and would officially take over on July 31, 1984. Brother Lawrence Maher FPM was the new Principal until 1996. Thus the school is now also associated by the Presentation Brothers.

The Presentation Brothers of Mary are a religious congregation founded with a single intention—to work for the Christian education and the formation of youth. The Order was founded in 1802 in Ireland by Blessed Edmund Ignatius Rice, a businessman of Waterford. By the age of forty, Rice was noted as a generous layman, particularly concerned with the plight of the poor. After entering a monastery in Europe, he realized that his real vocation lay with the uneducated and poverty-stricken youth of Waterford. In 1802 Edmund Rice gave up his personal wealth, and by 1822 had become the founder of the Presentation Brothers and the Congregation of Christian Brothers. He died in 1844. Today the Presentation Brothers operate elementary and secondary schools in the West Indies, Ireland, Ghana, Nigeria, and Canada.

In June 1984, the Ontario Government announced it would begin funding Catholic high schools beyond Grade 10 beginning in 1985. In 1987, Brebeuf ceased to be a private school, although it maintained a culture and many traditions of an independent institution. The school's population grew rapidly from approximately 600 to over 1,200 by 1992.

In 2001, the Toronto Catholic District School Board announced funding for a new building to replace Brebeuf's outdated facilities and invested Can$23 million. The main architect was Rod Robbie who also designed the SkyDome. Under Principal Michael Pautler '76, the Brebeuf community was temporarily housed in the former Bathurst Heights Secondary School (later John Polanyi Collegiate Institute) while the new building was being constructed. On January 5, 2004, exactly forty years after Bishop Pocock presided over Brebeuf College School's Solemn Blessing, staff and students began classes in the new facility at the old campus. It was blessed in April of that year.

Mission statement
BREBEUF COLLEGE SCHOOL is a community of faith following in the traditions of the Jesuit Fathers and the Presentation Brothers. Brebeuf integrates Christian principles and Catholic values with all living and learning experiences in an environment recognizing the spiritual dignity of each individual as a child of God.

BREBEUF COLLEGE SCHOOL is a family of students, teachers, staff, parents, and alumni working together to encourage excellence, integrity, responsibility, initiative, and respect for one another  in the classroom, on the playing field, and in the larger community of parish, municipality, and country.

BREBEUF COLLEGE SCHOOL stands for an education that develops soundness in mind, body, and soul centred on academic and moral discipline. Brebeuf encourages the spirit to soar and the imagination to inquire. Brebeuf nurtures the sense of wonder in each boy’s unique development. Brebeuf rewards hard work and eager application. Brebeuf expects all members of its family to realize the fullness of the potential given by God.

BREBEUF COLLEGE SCHOOL believes that the way, the truth, and the life, informed by the teachings of Jesus, lead one to success, to happiness, and to service as Men for Others. Brebeuf's hallmarks are faith, excellence,  fellowship and  tradition.

Crest and motto

The Brebeuf Crest was designed by Father Robert Meagher S.J., Brebeuf's founding Principal. It symbolizes the rich heritage and history of Brebeuf.

The black bull is taken from the family coat-of-arms of St. Jean de Brebeuf.

The cross of St. George and maple leaves are taken from the arms of the Province of Ontario.

The blazing sun forms the arms of the Society of Jesus who founded the school, and of which Brebeuf was a member. The flames on the circle symbolize the infinite love of Christ, and the little cross, the pinnacle of that love. The Greek letters "iota", "eta," and "sigma" are the first three letters of Jesus's name.

The angel's wings behind the large cross are those of St. Michael, the patron saint of the Archdiocese of Toronto. The five small crosses on the larger cross represent each of the five Canadian Jesuit Martyrs (Jean de Brebeuf, Gabriel Lalement, Antoine Daniel, Charles Garnier, and Noel Chabanel).

The Latin motto "Studio Gradum Faciant" is translated "To win merit through study", emphasizing the academic nature of the school.

Overview

Religious life
The school follows the Catholic Church's sacramental and liturgical calendar. Students take religion courses in each year of school. Each day begins with a community prayer over the public address system and  a communion service in the chapel. The Angelus is recited at 10:00 each day. Students participate in a day-retreat as part of their religion class. Kairos (retreats) are offered to students in Grade 11.  Masses are held throughout the year (Feast of Brebeuf, Thanksgiving, Advent, Feast of Edmund Rice, Closing Mass, etc.) and on every First Friday of the month. Exposition and adoration of the Blessed Sacrament takes place following the First Friday Mass.

Students are encouraged often to put their faith into action as "men for others" in various charity drives and social justice initiatives. The school's Youth Ministry group has over one hundred student members.

The school is active in the promotion of social justice issues. Students and staff organize a social justice symposium annually for Catholic high school students. Its aim is to highlight social injustices in Toronto and around the world and to give students concrete ways of putting their faith into action by fighting these injustices. The symposium is led by a group of students and by a staff moderator, Michael Da Costa.

In 2011 the school instituted the first of its international service and leadership programmes with a trip to Ghana in conjunction with the Presentation Brothers. Since 2012, students and staff have participated in similar trips to St. Lucia, Peru, Grenada, and Ireland.

The school maintains excellent and ongoing relations with the Jesuits, the school's founding religious order and the Presentation Brothers, through chaplaincy, masses, guest speakers, retreats, guest speakers, fundraising, and other collaborative ventures.

Awards and scholarships
The Honour Roll recognizes students who have an overall average of 80% with no marks below 60%. Students who achieve Honour Roll status for every year of high school are inducted into the Blessed Edmund Rice Society, named for the Founder of the Presentation Brothers, at Graduation.

There are awards for the highest overall average in each grade and these are named for the college's Jesuit principals:
Grade 9 - Father Robert Meagher S.J. Award
Grade 10 - Father Clement Crusoe S.J. Award
Grade 11 - Father Kenneth Casey S.J. Award
Grade 12 - Father Winston Rye S.J. Award

In 2012, the school created the Order of St Jean de Brebeuf to recognize members of the school community who exemplify the values and ideals for which Brebeuf College School stands, namely: faith, discipline, integrity, hard work, humility, excellence, success, pursuit of the greater good, friendship, and community, and for always being 'Men and Women For Others'.

2010–2011 EQAO results 
88% of Grade 9 Academic math students were at Level 3 or 4.  There were 173 students in the Grade 9 Academic classes during this time frame, 5% of whom were students with Special Education Needs (excluding gifted).

37% of Grade 9 Applied math students were at Level 3 or 4.  There were 51 students in the Grade 9 Applied classes during this time frame, 55% of whom were students with Special Education Needs (excluding gifted).

83% of first-time eligible students were successful in the Grade 10 literacy test.  46% of previously eligible students were successful in the Grade 10 literacy test.

Fraser Institute ranking 

The Fraser Institute's 2010/2011 report on Brebeuf College School gave it an overall grade of 6.5/10, ranking it at 299 of 718 publicly funded secondary schools in Ontario.  The school is ranked as 241 out of 691 is the most recent years, with ratings of 7.7 in 2007; 7.5 in 2008; 7.3 in 2009; 5.4 in 2010; and 6.5 in 2011.

Co-curricular activities

Brebeuf offers a large variety of extracurricular activities and clubs, including: debating, school newspaper, peer tutoring, Student Council, Robotics, Math Club, Social Justice Club, Art Club, School Bands, Theatre Brebeuf, Youth Ministry etc.

In addition to on-campus co-curricular activities, the school's chaplaincy department also offers various annual excursions for students ranging from three-day overnight retreats to eleven-day pilgrimages to Italy during Holy Week.

Varsity sports
Hockey, rugby, football, tennis, golf, volleyball, basketball, curling, track and field, cross country, table tennis, badminton, swimming, soccer.

House system
In 2010, the school reintroduced a House System and all Grade 9 students were placed in one of five Houses named for the Canadian Jesuit Martyrs who were contemporaries of St. Jean de Brebeuf. Students participate in a variety of athletic and academic competitions. The House names are:
 St. Isaac Jogues S.J.
 St. Charles Garnier S.J.
 St. Jean de Lalande S.J.
 St. Antoine Daniel S.J.
 St. Noel Chabanel S.J.
 St. Gabriel Lalement S.J.

School media
The "B" newspaper has been published continuously since 1963.

The "Brebeuf Relations" is the newsletter sent out 3-4 times per year to the parent community and friends of the school.

The "Alumni B" is published each December and has kept Old Boys connected to their alma mater since 1982.

Brebeuf's yearbook, "Echon" takes its name from St. Jean de Brebeuf's name in the Huron language, and has been produced annually since 1967.

“Brebeuf TV” is a closed-circuit television system consisting of eight televisions placed strategically throughout the school. It broadcasts announcements, weather, the house competition leaderboard, video clips produced by the school's media arts and communications technology courses. The system is primarily run by the school’s ICT SHSM team.

Uniform
The school consists of a distinctive black blazer, or black fleece polo top with white dress shirt and grey pants. In the warmer weather, students have the option of wearing a crested golf shirt. The school crest, in the school colours of red, black and white, bears the motto, "Studio Gradum Faciant".

Student government
The student body is represented by a Student Council, elected directly by the students. The executive consists of a President, Vice-President, two Event Representatives, two Social Media Representatives, and two House Representatives.

Student Council organizes such events as dances, clothing sales, pep rallies, the graduation formal, and intramural sports.

Traditions
 First Friday Masses: These are held on the first Friday of every month in honour of the Sacred Heart of Jesus.
 Can-Aid: A canned-food drive held before Christmas every year since 1984. Donations go to the Good Shepherd Refuge. The record is slightly over 53,000 cans.
 Communion Breakfast: A mass and breakfast for students, staff, and their families begun in 1963.
 Theatre Brebeuf: Every year the students put on a play or musical, usually involving students from St. Joseph's Morrow Park and Loretto Abbey.
 Club Brebeuf: The music council holds an annual talent show in which schools from Brebeuf, St. Joseph's Morrow Park and Loretto Abbey show off their talent. The funds from this event goes towards a charity that supports cancer research, Meagan's Walk.
 Brother Maher Fund: Established in 2002, students raise money for Presentation Brothers' schools in Ghana.
 Town Hall: Student Council elections are preceded by speeches by candidates. Once rowdy affairs, especially in the 1970s and 1980s, they are now more dignified and focus primarily on the speeches.
 Christmas Assembly: Held on the last day of classes before Christmas break, students and teachers perform a variety of Christmas-themed entertainment. Teachers also put on humorous skits for students.

Administration

Principals

Vice Principals
Anthony Bellisario - now Principal at James Cardinal McGuigan.  
Don Clattenburg
Paul Coady
Shirley Gasparet
Neil Gazeley (1963–1991)
Peter Lee
Joseph Liscio (2008–2012) - now at Senator O'Connor.  
Peter Murphy
Alex Pope (2005–08). Then, served at Monsignor Percy Johnson (2008–2011), St. Basil-the-Great (2012–2013); and Francis Libermann (2013-15).
Joseph Sansone (2009–2013) - now at Michael Power/St. Joseph; formerly at St. Patrick.  
John Shanahan - Currently Superintendent, Area 6
Tom Sullivan
Nadia Young (2012–2014) - formerly a TCDSB Literacy Teacher
Monica Calligaro
Walter Spano
Tim McGrenere

Notable alumni

Prominent alumni
Some prominent alumni include:
 Joseph Boyden, Giller Award-winning author of "Through Black Spruce", "Three Day Road" and "The Orenda".
 Kevin Sullivan, a film director of such Canadian films as "Anne of Green Gables" and "Road to Avonlea".
 Gar Knutson, former Member of Parliament and Minister of the Crown (Secretary of State for Central and Eastern Europe and the Middle East and Minister of State for International Trade).
 Marc Kielburger, Rhodes Scholar and co-founder of Me to We, Free the Children and Leaders Today.
 Mike Murphy, former coach of the Toronto Maple Leafs and current Vice President of the NHL.
 Larry Uteck, CFL player and former deputy-mayor of Halifax. Uteck Cup awarded annually to the top collegiate football team in Eastern Canada
 Fabrizio Filippo, a well-known Toronto actor.
 Richard Ciano, former president of the Ontario PC Party and former vice-president of the Conservative Party of Canada.
 Christopher E. Rudd, Professor, Harvard and Cambridge Universities, credited with major discoveries in the field of immunology.
 Charles Foran, writer.

Prominent former staff

 Terrence Prendergast S.J., Archbishop of Ottawa.

See also
 List of high schools in Ontario
 List of Jesuit sites

References

External links

TCDSB Portal
Brebeuf Alumni Association
Presentation Brothers
Jesuits of English Canada

Toronto Catholic District School Board
High schools in Toronto
Catholic secondary schools in Ontario
Educational institutions established in 1963
Presentation Brothers schools
Boys' schools in Canada
Defunct Jesuit schools
1963 establishments in Ontario
North York